Zareh Nicholas Chinlund (born November 18, 1961) is an American actor.

Early life and education
Chinlund was born in New York City. He attended the Friends Seminary in Lower Manhattan, later moving to Albany, New York in order to participate in Albany High School's varsity basketball program. Chinlund had designs on further pursuing basketball at Brown University and majoring in history, but was sidelined with a shoulder injury. The resulting injury left a two-inch scar on his left shoulder.

Career
Chinlund guest starred on The X-Files second-season episode "Irresistible" playing serial killer Donnie Pfaster, for which he garnered major critical acclaim. In 2000 he had a small role in episode two of Gilmore Girls. In 2000 he had a recurring role in two episodes of Buffy the Vampire Slayer: "Listening to Fear" and "Into the Woods".

In recent years, Chinlund has been seen in several independent projects, notably A Brother's Kiss (1997). He also served as the executive producer of the film, which was directed by childhood friend Seth Zvi Rosenfeld. A Brother's Kiss was filmed in and around the neighborhood where Chinlund and Rosenfeld grew up. The film tells the story of two brothers, Lex (Chinlund) and Mick (Michael Raynor), who grow up in the hard streets of New York. Chinlund continued in his long vein of independent features with roles in Chutney Popcorn (1999), Amy's Orgasm (2001), Goodnight Joseph Parker (2004) and Sinner (2007).

Chinlund has starred in big-screen movies including Tears of the Sun (2003), Con Air (1997), The Chronicles of Riddick (2004), directed by David Twohy, who also directed Chinlund in the underwater thriller Below (2002), and Ultraviolet (2006). He also reprised his X-Files role as Donnie Pfaster for a seventh-season episode entitled "Orison". Chinlund was also in Training Day, Eraser and The Legend of Zorro.

Chinlund has also made guest appearances in the long-running TV drama series Law & Order, as well as in its spinoff, Law & Order: Special Victims Unit. Chinlund had originally screen-tested for the co-starring role of Elliot Stabler in the latter show, according to Christopher Meloni, who won the role.

As with his film roles, he played villainous roles in those two shows, most notably as a defense attorney and an unethical journalist in the original Law & Order, and a serial killer in Special Victims Unit. Chinlund also played a Native American Casino President and CEO, "Chief Doug Smith" in the fourth-season episode "Christopher" of the hit HBO original series, The Sopranos. In 2009, he made an appearance on Castle in the first-season episode "Home Is Where The Heart Stops".  In 2010, he made an appearance on House in the sixth-season episode titled "The Down Low", playing a drug dealer named Eddie.

Awards
 Best Actor in a Leading Role, Sinner, 41st Annual Brooklyn Arts Council International Film & Video Festival

Filmography

References

External links

Goodnight Joseph Parker
Film Threat review of SINNER

1961 births
20th-century American male actors
21st-century American male actors
American male film actors
American male television actors
American male voice actors
Living people
Male actors from New York City
Friends Seminary alumni
Brown Bears men's basketball players